Alberto Agnesi (born November 21, 1977) is a Mexican telenovela and stage actor. He has recently acted in Señora acero, La leona and Operación Pacífico.

Life

He is known because his Tequila brand Señor de los cielos, Reina del sur and Auténtico Corajillo.

Filmography

References

External links

Living people
Mexican male telenovela actors
Mexican male stage actors
Male actors from Guadalajara, Jalisco
Mexican people of Italian descent
1977 births